The Battle of Zboriv, during the Khmelnytsky Uprising, was fought near the vicinity of Zborów (village of Mlynivtsi, Ukraine) on the Strypa River, and near the Siege of Zbarazh.  The battle was fought between the combined Cossack-Crimean force and the Crown army of the Polish–Lithuanian Commonwealth.

King John II Casimir Vasa and the main Polish army left Warsaw on 23 June and had made it to Toporiv in the final days of July when Mikolaj Skrzetuski (called Jan Skrzetuski in Henryk Sienkiewicz's With fire and Sword) informed the king of the desperate situation at Zbarazh.  The king made it to within a half-mile of Zboriv on 13 August.

Battle
On August 9, 1649, Bohdan Khmelnytsky had redeployed his main forces from Zbarazh to Staryi Zbarazh to the west, where the terrain hid them from the Poles, and he used deception to prevent the besieged from noticing.  The Horde, followed by the Cossack Host, advanced toward the royal camp during the night of 15 August.

The Crown forces were surprised during the rainy and foggy day while they crossed the Strypa River. The Horde split into two parts and attacked from the front and the back, but the king rallied his army to repel the attack and the Tatars retreated by nightfall.

The night brought a council of war on the Polish side and two letters from the king, one for the Khan and one for Khmelnytsky.  The letter to the khan "reminded the khan of the favor that he had enjoyed from the Poles in his youth, while sojourning as a captive... invited the khan to a renewal of their old friendship... receiving money for past, present, and future years." The letter to Khmelnytsky commanded him to "abandon all hostile actions and retreat ten miles from our army, and send us your envoys - what you desire from us and from the Commonwealth."

The next day brought more attacks from the Cossacks and the Tatars on two fronts, but then, a letter from the khan and Khmelnytsky arrived.  The khan was prepared to negotiate if there was "satisfaction of the Cossacks, payment of the suspended tribute... a substantial consideration... above the tribute, as well as permission for the Horde to take captives on its way back."

Aftermath
On 18 August, the Treaty of Zboriv (Zborów) was agreed upon by Khmelnytsky and Lord Commissioners Jerzy Ossolinski, Lord Crown Chancellor, Kazimierz Lew Sapieha, Lord Chancellor of the Grand Duchy of Lithuania Krzysztof Koniecpolski, Lord Palatine of Belz, Stanislaw Witowski, Lord of Sandomierz, and Adam Kysil, Lord Palatine of Kyiv.  "It was drafted not in the form of a treaty... but as a unilateral royal manifesto... at the request and intervention of the Crimean khan."

References

External links
 Battle of Zboriv. Encyclopedia of Ukraine.

Zboriv 1649
Zboriv
1649 in the Polish–Lithuanian Commonwealth
History of Ternopil Oblast
Zboriv